Max TV is a former New Zealand music TV channel.

Max TV may also refer to:

 You TV, a Sri Lankan analog television channel, formerly known as Max TV
 AKTA TV, a Romanian DTH platform, formerly known as Max TV
 Cinemax, a cable TV channel